The Monster is a 1925 American silent horror comedy film directed by Roland West, based on the stage play of the same name by Crane Wilbur, and starring Lon Chaney and comedian Johnny Arthur.  The screenplay was written by Willard Mack and Albert Kenyon. It is remembered as an early prototype "old dark house" movie, as well as a precedent to a number of horror film subgenres such as mad scientists with imbecilic assistants, among others. A great shot of the mad doctor and his monstrous cronies can be seen on the Internet. Some sources list the film's release date as March 1925 while others say February.

The film has been shown on the TCM network with an alternative and uncredited musical score. West later went on to direct The Bat (1926) and its later sound remake The Bat Whispers (1930).

Although the film only earned $55,600 for the week ending on February 18, 1925, the film could be considered the first horror film in history to top the North American box office, because the gross reported by Variety was the highest amount listed for that week, in theaters nationwide. This was not an MGM movie; it was made by Roland West Productions and Tec-Art, and only distributed by MGM. The film was originally released with lavish color tints that enhanced the eerie mood.
 The film's tagline was "A mystery thriller and a love adventure. The romance of a boy and a girl in a mansion of hidden motives. You'll Guess! You'll Gasp! You'll love it! A Mansion of Many Doors- A House of Strange Shadows - What lies beyond the door? WHAT does it mean? Who can solve it? You'll keep guessing until the very end."

Plot
John Bowman, a wealthy farmer, is kidnapped one night after two mysterious men lure his car off the road. When the wreckage is discovered the next day, constable Russ Mason (Charles Sellon) forms a search party with Amos Rugg (Hallam Cooley) and Johnny Goodlittle (Johnny Arthur). Johnny has just graduated from crime school, receiving a diploma as an amateur detective.

Amos and Johnny both work at the general store in Danburg. They are both in love with Betty Watson (Gertrude Olmstead), the storeowner's daughter. Attempting to woo Betty, Amos invites her on a drive in the country. Meanwhile, Johnny has followed a mysterious stranger to the country. The strange man has lured Amos' car off the road and kidnapped the couple. Johnny accidentally enters a hidden tunnel, and all three end up at Dr Edwards' Sanitarium.

Once inside, they are greeted by Dr. Gustave Ziska (Lon Chaney), who introduces Rigo (George Austin), Caliban (Walter James), and Daffy Dan (Knute Erickson), his three patients. Ziska explains that he took control of the asylum after it had closed. After many attempts to expunge the three hostages, they are captured and sent to a dungeon, wherein Johnny finds Dr. Edwards and John Bowman have been kidnapped by Dr. Ziska and his cronies.

Dr. Edwards tells Johnny that Ziska, Caliban, Rigo and Daffy Dan were once his patients in the sanitarium. Ziska had been a great surgeon who went mad and began to perform unorthodox operations. He now intends to perform experiments on Betty and Amos, attempting to discover the secret of eternal life.

Amos and Johnny are captured and brought to Ziska's laboratory, where Betty lies fastened to a surgical bed. Amos is strapped to the "death chair" and connected to Betty through a transducer, which will exchange their souls. Johnny eludes Ziska's henchmen and escapes up to the roof, sending up flares which are seen by policemen investigating the wreckage of Amos' car.

Having escaped, Johnny disguises himself as Rigo and begins to assist the doctor. He frees Betty and Amos and straps Ziska to his own death chair. Caliban appears and, mistaking the figure in the chair for Amos, activates the transducer, removing Ziska's soul from his body. Because there is no one on the surgical bed, there is no soul to complete the exchange, and Ziska is rendered completely lifeless.

Realizing his mistake, Caliban is distracted and Johnny captures him by hooking a winch to the monster's feet and hoisting him upside down. The policemen enter the laboratory to find that Johnny has successfully apprehended the madmen and located the kidnapped people. This is enough to gain him the police department's respect as a detective, and to win Betty's heart and hand.

Cast

 Lon Chaney as Dr. Gustave Ziska
 Johnny Arthur as Johnny Goodlittle, amateur detective
 Gertrude Olmstead as Betty Watson
 Hallam Cooley as Amos Rugg
 Charles Sellon as Russ Mason, a constable
 Walter James as Caliban
 Knute Erickson as Daffy Dan
 George Austin as Rigo
 Edward McWade as Luke Watson, Betty's father
 Ethel Wales as Mrs Watson, Betty's mother
 Elmo Billings as Freckle-Faced Kid (uncredited)
 Herbert Prior as Dr. Edwards (uncredited)
 Matthew Betz as Detective Jennings (uncredited)
 Dorothy Vernon as Townswoman at Accident Scene (uncredited)
 William H. Turner as Detective Jennings (uncredited)

In the play's 1933 revival, DeWolf Hopper played Dr. Ziska, one of his last roles.Walter James also played Caliban in the 1922 play.

Genre

The genre and cinematic style of The Monster is ambiguous. Though preceded by several films such as The Cabinet of Dr. Caligari, it stands as an early mad scientist movie, and is arguably the first to feature the mad doctor with a cabal of monstrous minions to do his bidding. The picture also stands as an early example of an '"old dark house" movie, even preceding The Old Dark House (1932) itself.

A distinguishing quality of The Monster which deviates from most horror films is its use of subtle humour in serious or dramatic situations. As in many conventional comedies, the protagonist Johnny Goodlittle is a comic relief character. He is also an early example of an effeminate, cowardly hero, as the actor Johnny Arthur usually played.

The style of humor is often ironic or a running gag, such as Johnny's faith in candles and flares to call for help, or reliance on his "ingenuity" to overcome dire circumstances. However, unlike many contemporary horror movies that involve comedic elements, the dramatic scenes and eerie effects of The Monster are not intended to be campy (cf. The Toxic Avenger (1985)), nor are they the crux of the plot (cf. The Cat and the Canary (1939)). Critic Troy Howarth stated "Viewers expecting a typical Lon Chaney vehicle are in for a major disappointment, as the actor doesn't show up into well into the picture. And while he admittedly makes for an alarming presence.....it's not much of a role and doesn't allow him to evoke the kind of audience empathy one normally associates with the great actor."

Reception
"As always, Lon Chaney does excellent work in an unusual character role. He appears as the sinister surgeon in charge and scores heavily although his role is secondary to that of Johnny Arthur as the boob detective." ---Moving Picture World

"'The Monster' was a corking stage thriller. As a picture it proves to be somewhat suspenseful, but it seemingly is played too fast to get the full effectiveness that there was in the play...Lon Chaney does not make the crazed surgeon as terrifying a picture as he might have, and in that the film lets down to a certain extent." ---Variety

"The starch seems to have been taken out of the pictorial conception of THE MONSTER by the inclusion of too much light comedy. The result is that, although this film possesses a degree of queer entertainment, it is neither fish, fowl nor good red herring. The thrills that might have chilled one's feet and finger tips end in causing chuckles and giggles...Mr. Chaney does not have very much to do, but his various appearances are effective...Chaney looks as if he could have enjoyed a more serious portrayal of the theme." ---The New York Times

"The Monster seems to us to be Lon Chaney's best part of recent years, because his art comes from within, not without...In The Monster, he appears as himself with no disfiguring makeup....a thrilling picture"--- Movie Weekly

"An entertaining comedy and mystery play...but it will prove too gruesome for tender-hearted people." ---Harrison's Reports

"Spook thriller that mingles laughs and thrills in rapid succession and includes a quantity of hair-raising stunts... Johnny Arthur's part seems more important than Chaney's" ---Film Daily

"Brrrr, this one will give you delicious creeps... A real thriller!" ---Photoplay

Film historian Jon Mirsalis opined "THE MONSTER will prove somewhat of a disappointment to die-hard Chaney fans, but a delight to connoisseurs of Director Roland West's stylistic Gothic dramas. Like some of his other works, especially THE BAT and THE BAT WHISPERS, THE MONSTER is a lavish production marked by Gothic sets, lush art design, and is punctuated by both the grotesque and quite a bit of comic relief supplied by Arthur."

References

External links

The Monster at silentera.com with still
Stills at moviessilently.com
The Monster on TCM

1925 films
1920s monster movies
American silent feature films
American black-and-white films
American films based on plays
American comedy horror films
Films directed by Roland West
American haunted house films
Metro-Goldwyn-Mayer films
1920s comedy horror films
1925 comedy films
1920s English-language films
1920s American films
Silent comedy-drama films
1925 horror films
Silent horror films
Silent American drama films
Silent American comedy films